The list of ship launches in 1731 includes a chronological list of some ships launched in 1731.


References

1731
Ship launches